Grenier is a surname. It is a French word for attic, loft, or granary. Notable people with the surname include:

 Adrian Grenier
 Angèle Grenier, Canadian maple syrup producer
 Auguste Jean François Grenier (1814–1890), French doctor and entomologist
 Clément Grenier
 Eustace Grenier
 Hugo Grenier, French tennis player
 Jacques de Grenier (1736–1803), French Navy officer
 Jean Charles Marie Grenier (1808–1875), French botanist and naturalist
 John Grenier
 Louis Grenier, fictional character
 Martin Grenier
 Philippe Grenier
 Richard Grenier (disambiguation)
 Robert Grenier (CIA officer)
 Robert Grenier (poet)
 Roger Grenier
 Suzanne Blais-Grenier
 Sylvain Grenier
 Walter I Grenier, Lord of Caesarea
 Zach Grenier